Mario Bertolo (28 January 1929 – 20 September 2009) was a French professional racing cyclist. He rode in three editions of the Tour de France. Italian by birth, he was naturalized on 15 November 1958.

References

External links
 

1929 births
2009 deaths
French male cyclists
Cyclists from Friuli Venezia Giulia
Italian emigrants to France
People from the Province of Pordenone